William Ward (January 1, 1837 – February 27, 1895) was an American politician from Pennsylvania who served as a Republican member of the U.S. House of Representatives from Pennsylvania's 6th congressional district from 1877 to 1883.

Life and career
William Ward was born in Philadelphia, Pennsylvania.  He attended Girard College in Philadelphia.  He learned the art of printing in the office of the Delaware County Republican in Chester, Pennsylvania.  He studied law, was admitted to the bar in August 1859 and commenced practice in Chester.  He was also engaged in the land business and banking.  He served as a member of the Chester City Council and city solicitor.

Congress
Ward was elected as a Republican to the Forty-fifth, Forty-sixth, and Forty-seventh Congresses.  He was not a candidate for renomination in 1882.

Later career and death

He resumed the practice of his profession and his former business pursuits in Chester where he died in 1895.  Interment in the Chester Rural Cemetery.

Sources

The Political Graveyard

1837 births
1895 deaths
Burials at Chester Rural Cemetery
Pennsylvania city council members
Pennsylvania lawyers
Politicians from Philadelphia
Republican Party members of the United States House of Representatives from Pennsylvania
19th-century American politicians
19th-century American lawyers